A fiddler is a person who plays a fiddle or violin.

Fiddler may also refer to:

People
 Amp Fiddler, American funk and soul musician, born Joseph Fiddler
 Nancy Fiddler (born 1956), American cross country skier
 Ronald Fiddler (1966–2017), British Guantanamo Bay detainee and suicide bomber
 Vernon Fiddler (born 1980), Canadian hockey player

Arts, entertainment, and media

Fictional characters
 Fiddler (comics), a DC Comics villain
 Fiddler (mystery series), a character in a mystery series by A.E. Maxwell
Fiddler Pig, from Disney’s Three Little Pigs

Music
 Fabrangen Fiddlers, an American musical group founded in 1971
 Fiddler Records, a record label

Productions
 Fiddler on the Roof (1964), a Broadway musical often referred to as "Fiddler"
 Fiddler on the Roof (film), the 1971 film version of the musical

Science 
 Fiddler crab, a species of crab found in parts of the Atlantic and Pacific oceans
 Fiddler ray, a type of ray found on the south and east coasts of Australia

Other uses
 Fiddler (software), an HTTP debugging proxy
 Tupolev Tu-28 (NATO reporting name: Fiddler), a fighter aircraft

See also
 Fiddler's Green (disambiguation)
 Fiedler, German translation of surname